The Yilin Press is a publishing house established in 1988, as a division of Phoenix Publishing & Media, Inc., and focused on academic publishing. Its office in Nanjing, capital of Jiangsu province, China.  Its current director is Gu Aibin and the editor-in-chief is Liu Feng.

References

External links
  

Book publishing companies of China
Publishing companies established in 1988
Mass media in Nanjing